Tabon Island, or Isla Tabón, is part of the Calbuco Archipelago, located in Chile.

At high tide the water level covers the pebble ridges that connect the island's peaks, dividing it into three sub-islands: Lin, Ilto, and Polmalluelhe.

References

External links
 Map

Calbuco Archipelago
Islands of Los Lagos Region